Vadim Viktorovich Bakatin (6 November 1937 – 31 July 2022) was a Russian politician who served as the last chairman of the KGB in 1991. He was the last surviving former chairman of this organization. He was appointed to dismantle the KGB, but he was unable to control this organization and to fulfill the task due to political reasons. However, he was able to fulfill a plan to disintegrate the intelligence agency into separate organizations. He ran for the Russian presidency as an independent candidate in June 1991.

Early life and education
Vadim Bakatin was born in Kiselyovsk, Kemerovo Oblast, in 1937. He was a graduate of the Novosibirsk Civil Engineering Institute and the Academy of Social Sciences under the CPSU Central Committee.

Career
From 1960 to 1971, Bakatin was supervisor, chief engineer, and director of construction works. From 1964 to 1991, he was the member of the Communist Party of the Soviet Union. From 1986 to 1990, he served as the member of CPSU Central Committee. Bakatin was appointed Minister of Interior of the Soviet Union in 1988, replacing Alexander Vlasov. Bakatin's tenure lasted until 1990. In 1991, he was made the head of KGB. Eventually, he was able to disintegrate the KGB, dismiss Fourth Department of the Chief Directorate "З", Fifth Chief Directorate, the actual political police apparatus that ran the secret informants, political dossiers, and dissident-hunting machinery.

After the disintegration of the KGB, he served as head of the Inter-republican Security Service of the Soviet Union.

Bakatin had been put forth as a candidate for the Communist Party's nomination for the 1990 Soviet Union presidential election. However, he decided not to compete.

In 1991, Vadim Bakatin as Chief of the KGB revealed to the U.S. ambassador Robert Schwarz Strauss to the Soviet Union the methods that had been used to install covert listening devices in the building that had been intended to replace Spaso House as the American embassy in Moscow. Strauss reported that this revelation was made out of a sense of cooperation and goodwill, with "no strings attached". Bakatin's action was met with harsh criticism, including allegations of treason which were eventually retracted.

In 1992, Bakatin was appointed vice-president and director of the department of political and international relations of the international "Reforma" fund. From 1997 on, Bakatin was a director/advisor of Baring Vostok (Moscow).

1991 presidential campaign

Bakatin was a candidate in the 1991 Russian presidential election. His running mate was Ramazan Abdulatipov. He ultimately placed last in the election out of six candidates, receiving 2,719,757 votes (3.5% of the votes cast).

Personal life
Vadim Bakatin, his grandson, (born 24 June 1998) is an International football player and plays for AS Monaco FC.

Bakatin died on 31 July 2022 at a hospital in Moscow, Russia, at the age of 84.

Quotes

References

External links
NUPI profile

1937 births
2022 deaths
People from Kiselyovsk
Central Committee of the Communist Party of the Soviet Union members
People's commissars and ministers of the Soviet Union
Members of the Supreme Soviet of the Soviet Union
Eleventh convocation members of the Supreme Soviet of the Soviet Union
Soviet Ministers of Internal Affairs
KGB chairmen
People of the KGB
Soviet lieutenant generals
Soviet engineers
20th-century Russian engineers
Candidates in the 1991 Russian presidential election
Russian civil engineers
Recipients of the Order of Lenin